Megachile pilidens is a species of bee in the family Megachilidae. It was described by Alfken in 1924.

References

Pilidens
Insects described in 1924